Malochim may refer to:
 Malachim (Hasidic group)
 Mal'achim, Hebrew for Angels